Grown is the third Korean studio album (fifth overall) by Korean boy band 2PM. The album was released in digital format on May 6, 2013.

Music videos
A teaser for the music video of "Comeback When You Hear This Song", the lead single of their album, was released on May 2, 2013 on the 2PM's official YouTube account. The full music video was released on May 6, 2013 along with 10 songs from the album. This album is a two title track album, the track "A.D.T.O.Y." was released on May 11, 2013.

Promotion
As part of their promotion activities for the album, from 2 May to 31 July 2013, the group took part in the 2PM G+Star Zone exhibition, at the Apgujeongrodeo Station. It is part of the G+Dream Project by Gangnam-gu Office for disadvantaged youth.

The group made their promotional appearance for the album was on M.net's M! Countdown on 16 May, where they performed "A.D.T.O.Y." and "Comeback When You Hear This Song", along with Shinhwa, for their album The Classic and Seo In-young for her EP Forever Young.

Track listing

Chart performance

Album chart

Sales

Singles

Comeback When You Hear This Song

A.D.T.O.Y

Other charted songs

Release history

References

External links 
 
 
 
 

2013 albums
2PM albums
JYP Entertainment albums
KMP Holdings albums
Korean-language albums